This is a list of transfers from and to the clubs in the Swedish top football league Allsvenskan. It contains all the players that have joined or left the clubs from the end of the 2007 season in October 2007 until the start of the 2008 season in April 2008.

AIK 

In

Out

Djurgårdens IF 

In

Out

IF Elfsborg 

In

Out

GAIS 

In

Out

Gefle IF 

In

Out

IFK Göteborg 

In

Out

Halmstads BK 

In

Out

Hammarby IF 

In

Out

Helsingborgs IF 

In

Out

Kalmar FF 

In

Out

Ljungskile SK 

In

Out

Malmö FF 

In

Out

IFK Norrköping 

In

Out

GIF Sundsvall 

In

Out

Trelleborgs FF 

In

Out

Örebro SK 

In

Out

Notes

Trans
Trans
2007-08
Sweden